During the 2013–14 German football season, TSG 1899 Hoffenheim competed in the Bundesliga.

Season summary
After the previous season's near brush with relegation, Hoffenheim was resurgent and finished in ninth, exactly 17 points from both relegation and Champions League qualification. They were also one of the division's top-scoring team, with the top two of Bayern Munich and Borussia Dortmund scoring more than Hoffenheim's 72. However, this coincided with the league's second-worst defense, with 70 goals being conceded.

First-team squad
Squad at end of season

Left club during season

Competitions

Bundesliga

League table

Results by matchday

Results summary

Matches

DFB-Pokal

Statistics

Appearances and Goals

|-
 ! colspan=14 style=background:#dcdcdc; text-align:center| Goalkeepers

 
 
 
|-
 ! colspan=14 style=background:#dcdcdc; text-align:center| Defenders

 
 
 
 
 
 
 
 
|-
 ! colspan=14 style=background:#dcdcdc; text-align:center| Midfielders

 
 
 
 
 
 
 
|-
 ! colspan=14 style=background:#dcdcdc; text-align:center| Forwards

 
 
 
 
 
 
 
 
|-
 ! colspan=14 style=background:#dcdcdc; text-align:center| Players transferred out during the season

References

Notes

TSG 1899 Hoffenheim seasons
TSG 1899 Hoffenheim